The twelfth season of the animated television series Archer debuted on FXX on August 25, 2021.

Production
This is the last season to feature Jessica Walter in her role as Malory Archer. Walter died after recording her voice parts for the season.

The episode "Mission: Difficult" is dedicated to her memory.

Episodes

References

External links
 
 

2021 American television seasons
Archer (2009 TV series) seasons
Television productions postponed due to the COVID-19 pandemic